There are 40 current and former places of worship in the borough of Fareham in Hampshire, England. There are 37 churches, chapels and meeting halls currently in use by various Christian denominations across the borough, and three former places of worship survive in alternative uses or, in one case, awaiting a new occupant. Fareham is one of 13 local government districts in the county of Hampshire—a large county in central southern England, with a densely populated coastal fringe facing the English Channel and a more rural hinterland. The borough of Fareham is largely urban and is located in the south of the county, occupying most of the gap between the cities of Southampton and Portsmouth. The old market town of Fareham, which gives the borough its name, is also the largest urban centre; much of the rest of the borough consists of 19th- and 20th-century suburban development which has joined up older villages such as Portchester, Sarisbury, Swanwick and Warsash.

The 2011 United Kingdom census reported that the majority of Fareham's residents are Christian. The largest number of churches in the borough belong to the Church of England—the country's Established Church. Ancient Church of England parish churches at Titchfield, Portchester, Crofton and in Fareham town survive in use; more were built in the Victorian era, particularly as the vast parish of Titchfield was divided as its villages grew; and two other Anglican churches opened in the 1960s in Fareham town.  Various Nonconformist groups started to meet locally in the early 19th century. Chapels in Titchfield and Sarisbury have their origins in small-scale Congregational meetings; Methodists were established in Fareham and Portchester by 1812 and 1826 respectively; and a Strict Baptist cause at Lower Swanwick is approaching its 200th anniversary.  The oldest of the borough's Roman Catholic churches dates from 1878, but the others are postwar buildings; and smaller groups such as Jehovah's Witnesses and the Plymouth Brethren Christian Church became established locally in the 20th century.

Historic England has awarded listed status to nine active and all three former places of worship in the borough. Buildings of "special architectural or historic interest" are placed on a statutory list  by Historic England, a Government body. Buildings of Grade I status, held by Portchester and Titchfield's Anglican churches, are defined as being of "exceptional interest"; three other churches are listed at Grade II*, used for "particularly important buildings of more than special interest"; and Grade II, a status held by four current and all three former churches, is used for buildings of "special interest".

Overview of the borough and its places of worship

The Borough of Fareham is situated in the south of Hampshire. The borough is mainly urban, and the vast majority of the population live in built-up areas. Water surrounds the borough to the west, southwest and southeast. The western boundary is formed by the River Hamble; on the other side is the Borough of Eastleigh. The foreshore of The Solent extends for several miles southeastwards from the river to Stokes Bay, forming the Borough of Fareham's southwestern edge. To the southeast, the land on which Portchester Castle, church and Roman fort are built juts out into the northwestern branch of Portsmouth Harbour. There are also land boundaries with the Borough of Gosport to the south, Portsmouth city to the east and the City of Winchester district to the north.

Saint Wilfrid is believed to have arrived in present-day Hampshire in 648 AD and introduced Christianity to the area around the River Meon. St Peter's Church at Titchfield was one of several churches founded in the period between this and the Norman conquest of England; like the county's other early churches its parish served villages across a wide area. Stonework in the lowest stage of the tower, originally a porch, survives from the Anglo-Saxon era, probably from around 700 AD.  Also of ancient origin is St Mary's Church at Portchester, dated definitively to the mid-1130s and "a first-class Norman monument" retaining its original cruciform plan.  By the end of the Middle Ages only one other church in the area covered by the present borough: Fareham town's parish church, St Peter and St Paul, originally a small chapel but now greatly extended.  Its appearance was transformed in the 18th and 19th centuries, but the medieval chancel is now a side chapel.

The population of the vast Titchfield parish grew in the 19th and 20th centuries as its constituent villages developed and the area became suburbanised.  In less than 100 years, the ecclesiastical parish was subdivided five times to create six separate parishes.  First to be created was the parish of Sarisbury with Swanwick in 1837, whose parish church was built around that time.  In 1871, the parish of Crofton was formed; the ancient St Edmund's Church was supplemented by a new church in Stubbington, the main centre of population, later that decade.  In 1872, Hook with Warsash parish was established for St Mary's Church at Hook, built the year before.  Locks Heath parish was formed in 1893; a parish church built the following year replaced an earlier mission chapel.  Finally, in 1930 a separate parish was created for Lee-on-the-Solent in the neighbouring borough of Gosport.

Until 1873, Roman Catholics in the Fareham area were served by the Catholic mission at Soberton, where a converted farmhouse served as a chapel and presbytery.  This was founded in 1747 by descendants of James III of Scotland who had fled persecution in the north of England.  Fr James Bellord, a future Vicar Apostolic of Gibraltar, founded a mission chapel in a shed in Fareham town centre in 1873, and the permanent Church of the Sacred Heart was opened in 1878.  Mass was celebrated in neighbouring Portchester from 1935, and a church was built in 1954 (now demolished).  By 1960 a weekly Mass was said in a drill hall at Park Gate by priests from Fareham, and the permanent Church of St Margaret Mary opened in 1966.  In 1976 a Mass centre was established in Stubbington, superseded in 1985 by the present Church of Our Lady of the Immaculate Conception; and in 1980 St Philip Howard's Church was opened in the south of Fareham town.  For some years from 1973, Catholics also shared St Columba's Anglican church in the Hill Park area of the town.

The Congregational movement, one of the forerunners of the present United Reformed Church denomination, was represented from the 17th century in Fareham town.  In 1836 adherents built a yellow-brick Gothic Revival chapel in the town centre.  This was sold for conversion into a pub and replaced by a modern building nearby in 1994.  A chapel was established at Titchfield in the early 19th century, and members of this church started house meetings at Warsash in 1811; a chapel was built there in 1845, and the present Warsash United Reformed Church replaced it in 1890.  The cause at Sarisbury Green was also founded in the early 19th century: house meetings developed from about 1800, and a chapel was provided in 1803.  In 1878 a second building (described as a branch church) opened on Chapel Road, now Swanwick Lane, in Lower Swanwick.  The 1803 chapel was replaced by a tin tabernacle and then by the present church in 1931.  The 1878 chapel at Lower Swanwick, which was formally registered as Swanwick Lane (Providence) Congregational Church in 1925, was deregistered in March 1980 and has been demolished, as was the former Locks Heath United Reformed Church.  This had opened in 1902 and was funded by a yacht-builder from Gosport.  The church at Sarisbury Green also assisted in establishing it.  It closed  1980 and the building was demolished after several years of use by the Baptists of Locks Heath Free Church.  Their new church was opened in 1990, and six years later another Baptist church was registered in Stubbington.  Another new Baptist church was registered in 2004 in the Hill Park area of Fareham.  In the town centre, the original Baptist chapel was replaced by a new building on the road to Gosport in 1932.  The group known as Strict Baptists have been established in the area even longer: they have worshipped at Lower Swanwick since 1835, and their present chapel dates from 1844.  It replaced a converted wooden boat-shed which regularly flooded during high tides on the tidal River Hamble.  Methodist congregations (all originally from the Wesleyan branch of that denomination) became established in Fareham town in 1812, Portchester in 1826 and Stubbington in the mid-19th century, but all now occupy 20th-century buildings.  The present churches were registered in 1939, 1933 and 1992 respectively.

Gospel halls and chapels with an Evangelical or Open Brethren character opened at Warsash (1908, but with origins in the 1860s), central Fareham (1910; rebuilt 1977; closed 2011), Park Gate (1922; rebuilt 1967), the Hill Park area of Fareham (1955; closed 2004) and the West End area of Fareham (1959; rebuilt 1965).  Meanwhile, the Brethren group now known as the Plymouth Brethren Christian Church opened a meeting room in Fareham in 1948 and registered their current building in 1972.

Religious affiliation
According to the 2011 United Kingdom census, 111,581 lived in the borough of Fareham.  Of these, 63.77% identified themselves as Christian, 0.48% were Muslim, 0.27% were Hindu, 0.25% were Buddhist, 0.07% were Sikh, 0.06% were Jewish, 0.46% followed another religion, 27.4% claimed no religious affiliation and 7.25% did not state their religion.  The proportions of Christians and people who followed no religion were higher than the figures in England as a whole (59.38% and 24.74% respectively).  Islam, Judaism, Hinduism, Sikhism and Buddhism had a much lower following in the borough than in the country overall: in 2011, 5.02% of people in England were Muslim, 1.52% were Hindu, 0.79% were Sikh, 0.49% were Jewish and 0.45% were Buddhist.

Administration

Anglican churches
All Anglican churches in the borough are part of the Anglican Diocese of Portsmouth, which is based at Portsmouth Cathedral.  The diocese has seven deaneries plus the cathedral's own separate deanery.  The Fareham Deanery is responsible for all the borough's parish churches: St Peter and St Paul, St John the Evangelist, Holy Trinity and St Columba in Fareham town, the Holy Rood and the old parish church of St Edmund at Stubbington, St John the Baptist at Locks Heath, St Mary at Hook (Warsash), St Mary at Portchester, St Paul at Sarisbury Green, St Peter at Titchfield and Whiteley Church in Whiteley Village.

Roman Catholic churches
The Catholic churches in Fareham, Park Gate and Stubbington are part of the Roman Catholic Diocese of Portsmouth, whose seat is the Cathedral of St John the Evangelist in Portsmouth.  All are in the Solent Pastoral Area of Deanery 5.  The parish of Fareham and Portchester includes the churches of the Sacred Heart and St Philip Howard, both in Fareham town centre; a church in Portchester built in 1954 and dedicated to Our Lady of Walsingham has been demolished.  As well as Portchester and Fareham, the villages of Knowle, Wickham, North Boarhunt and Southwick are covered by the parish.  St Margaret Mary's church at Park Gate is the parish church of an area covering Titchfield, Warsash, Sarisbury, Locks Heath, Lower Swanwick, Swanwick, Whiteley Village, Burridge and Curdridge.  The parish of Stubbington and Lee-on-the-Solent covers those two villages and is served by the Church of the Immaculate Conception in Stubbington and St John the Evangelist's Church in Lee-on-the-Solent (in the Borough of Gosport).

Other denominations
The borough's three Methodist churches—at Fareham, Portchester and Stubbington—are part of the 23-church East Solent and Downs Methodist Circuit.  Fareham Baptist New Life Church, Hill Park Baptist Church, Locks Heath Free Church and Stubbington Baptist Church belong to the Southern Counties Baptist Association.  Swanwick Shore Strict Baptist Chapel is affiliated with the Gospel Standard Baptist movement.  Titchfield Evangelical Church belongs to two Evangelical groups: the Fellowship of Independent Evangelical Churches (FIEC), a pastoral and administrative network of about 500 churches with an evangelical outlook, and Affinity (formerly the British Evangelical Council), a network of conservative Evangelical congregations throughout Great Britain.

Listed status

Two churches in the borough are Grade I-listed, three have Grade II* status and seven (including three former churches) are listed at Grade II.  As of February 2001, there were 423 listed buildings in the borough of Fareham: 2 with Grade I status, 15 listed at Grade II* and 406 with Grade II status.  In England, a building or structure is defined as "listed" when it is placed on a statutory register of buildings of "special architectural or historic interest" by the Secretary of State for Digital, Culture, Media and Sport, a Government department, in accordance with the Planning (Listed Buildings and Conservation Areas) Act 1990.  Historic England, a non-departmental public body, acts as an agency of this department to administer the process and advise the department on relevant issues.

Current places of worship

Former places of worship

Notes

References

Bibliography

 (Available online in 14 parts; Guide to abbreviations on page 6)

Fareham
Fareham
Fareham
Borough of Fareham
Lists of buildings and structures in Hampshire